West High School, also known as Knoxville West High School, is a public high school in the Knox County school district located at 3300 Sutherland Avenue in Knoxville, Tennessee. The feeder schools are Bearden Middle, Northwest Middle, and West Valley Middle. With the school colors of red and blue, the West High Rebels compete in various sports competitions in their district.

History
Knoxville West High School (West) is one of the fifteen area public high schools in the Knox County School District.  The school opened its doors in 1951 on the original site of the McGhee Tyson Airport. West was one of four high schools, along with East (now Austin-East), South (now South-Doyle), and Fulton, that opened when Knoxville High School closed.  Built to accommodate 850 students, West has undergone two major renovations and accommodates 1,300 students. The school is situated in the midtown area within five miles of the University of Tennessee.

Demographics
The demographic breakdown of the 1,355 students enrolled for the 2014-2015 school year was:
Male - 50.0%
Female - 50.0%
Native American/Alaskan - 0.1%
Asian/Pacific islanders - 1.4%
Black - 26.6%
Hispanic - 6.6%
White - 61.5%
Multiracial - 3.8%

In addition, 44.2% of the students were eligible for free or reduced lunch.

Athletics
WHS students have the opportunity to participate in the following sports: Soccer, baseball, basketball, softball, football, track, cross country, Cheerleading, Volleyball, dance, wrestling, swim and dive, tennis, and golf.

The West High School football team won the Tennessee state championship in 2014 and 2022.

Notable alumni
Henry Cho – comedian
Nathan Cottrell – NFL running back for the Jacksonville Jaguars
Don Everly and Phil Everly – The Everly Brothers
Bobby Ogdin – recording session pianist, member of Elvis Presley's TCB Band, the Marshall Tucker Band and Ween
Lowell "Chuck" Ramsey – former punter for the West High Rebels, Wake Forest Demon Deacons and the New York Jets from 1977 to 1984
Jami Rogers-Anderson – opera singer
Benjamin "Coach" Wade – three-time Survivor contestant, Survivor: South Pacific runner-up in 2011

References

External links
 West High's webpage

Public high schools in Tennessee
International Baccalaureate schools in Tennessee
Schools in Knoxville, Tennessee
1951 establishments in Tennessee
Educational institutions established in 1951